Charles Henry Winfield (April 22, 1822 – June 10, 1888) was a U.S. Representative from New York during the latter half of the American Civil War and the beginning of Reconstruction.

Biography
Winfield was born in Crawford, New York where he completed preparatory studies before going on to study law.

He was admitted to the bar in 1846 and commenced practice in Goshen, New York where he eventually went on to serve as district attorney for Orange County from 1850-1856.

Winfield was elected as a Democrat to the Thirty-eighth and Thirty-ninth Congresses (March 4, 1863 – March 3, 1867) but he was not a candidate for renomination in 1866 and resumed his legal practice.

He died in Walden, New York, June 10, 1888, and was interred in Wallkill Valley Cemetery.

References
 Retrieved on 2009-04-01

1822 births
1888 deaths
People of New York (state) in the American Civil War
New York (state) lawyers
People from Crawford, New York
Democratic Party members of the United States House of Representatives from New York (state)
People from Goshen, New York
People from Walden, New York
19th-century American politicians
19th-century American lawyers